Malcolm Shepherd may refer to:

Malcolm Shepherd, 2nd Baron Shepherd (1918–2001), British Labour politician and peer
Malcolm Shepherd (public servant) (1873–1960), senior Australian public servant

See also
Malcolm Sheppard (born 1988), American football player